Schnackenburg is a town in the Lüchow-Dannenberg district, in Lower Saxony, Germany. It is situated on the left bank of the Elbe. It is part of the Samtgemeinde ("collective municipality") Gartow. Lying at the easternmost projection of Lower Saxony, the town is bordered on all sides except the west by territory that was formerly East Germany. It is the least densely populated town ("Stadt") in what was West Germany, although there are nine towns in what was formerly East Germany that are less densely populated (mostly in Brandenburg).

Etymology of the toponym
The Polabian name of Schnackenburg is Godegord (also spelled Godegür in older German reference material), probably from god (< Slavic *gadă) ‘snake’ and gord (< Slavic *gordă) ‘fortress’, ‘town’. The German name Schnackenburg appears to be derived from Low Saxon Snaak or Snack ‘snake’ (plural Snaken or Snacken) and Borg ‘fortress’, ‘town’.

History
Between 1945 and 1990 Schnackenburg served as West German inner German border crossing for inland navigation on the Elbe. The crossing was open for freight vessels navigating between Czechoslovakia, the Soviet Zone of occupation in Germany (till 1949, thereafter the East German Democratic Republic), or West Berlin and the British zone of occupation (till 1949) and thereafter the West German Federal Republic of Germany. The traffic was subject to the Interzonal traffic regulations, that between West Germany and West Berlin followed the special regulations of the Transit Agreement (1972).

References
Johann Parum Schultze; Reinhold Olesch (Hrsg.): Fontes linguae Dravaenopolabicae minores et Chronica Venedica J. P. Schultzii. (= Slavistische Forschungen; Band 7). Böhlau, Köln und Graz 1967
Christian Hennig von Jessen: Vocabularium Venedicum (oder Wendisches Wörter-Buch) (1705). Nachdruck besorgt von Reinhold Olesch. - Köln [u.a.]: Böhlau 1959 (Gewährsmann des Pastors C. Hennig von Jessen war der polabisch sprechende Bauer Johann Janieschge aus Klennow)
Lorie Karnath, Enrique Martinez Celaya: The Return of the Storks, 2008, www.akiraikedagallery.com

Lüchow-Dannenberg